Diamantina Power Station is a combined-cycle gas turbine electricity generation plant in Mount Isa, Queensland. It was developed by APA Group and AGL Energy at a cost of $570 million. Siemens Energy supplied two blocks each with one steam turbine, two gas turbines and two heat-recovery steam generators, with supplementary firing burners. 

Construction commenced in 2012.  It became operational in mid-2014 with a generating capacity of 328 MW when combined with 60 MW provided by the adjacent Leichhardt Power Station and 26MW Thompson Power Station.

On 1 October 2014, the Australian Competition & Consumer Commission gave authorisation for the power station owner along with the operator of other generating equipment in the city, Stanwell Corporation, to manage electricity supplied to the North West Power System. However, from 1 January 2020, Diamantina Power Station Pty Ltd became the only major generator on the North West Power System when Stanwell Corporation placed Mica Creek Power Station into cold storage.

See also

 List of power stations in Queensland

References

External links
 APA website

Energy infrastructure completed in 2014
Buildings and structures in Mount Isa
Natural gas-fired power stations in Queensland
2014 establishments in Australia